Sharifabad District is in Pakdasht County, Tehran province, Iran. At the 2006 National Census, its population was 37,791 in 9,758 households. The following census in 2011 counted 41,941 people in 11,528 households. At the latest census in 2016, the district had 64,433 inhabitants in 18,751 households.

References 

Pakdasht County

Districts of Tehran Province

Populated places in Tehran Province

Populated places in Pakdasht County